Mountbatten (also known as Mountbatten Estate) is a neighbourhood located in the planning area of Marine Parade, Singapore.

History 
The neighbourhood is named after Lord Louis Mountbatten, the Supreme Allied Commander of the South East Asia Command, Governor General of India and British Military Administrator of Malaya from 1945 to 1946.

Layout 
Mountbatten Road is a major thoroughfare that stretches all the way from the junction with Nicoll Highway, Guillemard Road and Sims Way (where Kallang Airport Way branches out from Sims Way) in Kallang to Haig Road in Katong where it continues eastward as East Coast Road.

Points of interest 

 Katong Community Centre (formally Mountbatten CC)
 Goodman Arts Centre (former LASALLE College of the Arts)
 Sing Hoe Hotel (formerly Sin Hoe)
 Katong Shopping Centre
 Liv@MB

Transportation 
Mountbatten is served by Mountbatten MRT station and Dakota MRT station on the Circle MRT line. Both stations are situated under Old Airport Road.

Gallery

References 

Places in Singapore
Marine Parade
Kallang
Central Region, Singapore